is a Japanese footballer playing for Albion Park White Eagles.

Career
Born in Tokyo, he played with Latvian side FK Auda since 2013.  With Auda he played in the Latvian 1. Liga in the 2013 season. In summer 2013 he came to Serbia and after a successful trial he signed with top league side FK Sloboda Užice.  He joined Sloboda along with another Japanese player also coming from Latvia, Keisuke Ogawa, who came from FC Jūrmala.  Shohei Okuno made his debut in the 2013–14 Serbian SuperLiga in the second round match played on August 18, 2013, against FK Čukarički. He scored his first goal for the club on 29 September 2013 against Radnički 1923.

Next he move to Poland where he played with Pogoń Szczecin in the first half of the 2014–15 Ekstraklasa. During winter-break he moved to another Polish club, Bytovia Bytów, playing in the I liga.

DUring withre-break of the 2015–16 season, he left Poland and settled in Australia where he joined Albion Park White Eagles.

References

1990 births
Living people
Association football people from Tokyo
Japanese footballers
Japanese expatriate footballers
FK Auda players
Expatriate footballers in Latvia
Japanese expatriate sportspeople in Latvia
FK Sloboda Užice players
Serbian SuperLiga players
Expatriate footballers in Serbia
Pogoń Szczecin players
Bytovia Bytów players
Ekstraklasa players
Expatriate footballers in Poland
Albion Park White Eagles players
Expatriate soccer players in Australia
Association football midfielders
Association football forwards